Dalsnibba is a mountain in Stranda Municipality in Møre og Romsdal county, Norway. The  lake Djupvatnet lies directly to the southeast of the mountain. The mountain is located very near the county border with both Oppland and Sogn og Fjordane counties, in the southeastern part of Møre og Romsdal county.

Dalsnibba offers a good view and is therefore a popular tourist destination. Dalsnibba is often covered by snow even in the summer. It was completed in 1939 but due to the Second World War its official opening was delayed until July 19 1948. The road was tarmacked in 2013.

The Geiranger – From Fjord to Summit running and cycling race begins in the village of Geiranger and ends on top of Dalsnibba.

See also
List of mountains of Norway

References

External links
 See Dalsnibba in 360 degrees VR panorama

Stranda
Mountains of Møre og Romsdal